Radical 132 or radical self meaning "self" is one of the 29 Kangxi radicals (214 radicals in total) composed of 6 strokes.

In the Kangxi Dictionary, there are 34 characters (out of 49,030) to be found under this radical.

 is also the 137th indexing component in the Table of Indexing Chinese Character Components predominantly adopted by Simplified Chinese dictionaries published in mainland China.

Evolution

Derived characters

Literature

External links

Unihan Database - U+81EA

132
137